On Wings of Fire (originally titled A Quest for Zarathustra) is a 1986 English-language Indian film directed by Cyrus Bharucha and starring Zubin Mehta, Paul Shelley, Saeed Jaffrey, Amrish Puri, with Nigel Terry as Zarathustra and Derek Jacobi as the narrator. It is the first and only film to cover the philosophy and history of Zoroastrianism in a scholarly and dramatic way. The film was premiered at Mumbai's Sterling Cinema in June 1986, and was released in the United States in 2001.

Summary 
The film recounts the history of Zoroastrianism and prophet Zarathushtra, covering a period of 3500 years of the Zoroastrians and the Parsees of India. The story begins with the conductor Zubin Mehta, the film's pivotal figure, a westernised Parsi who visits his homeland to discover his roots, and in the process learns about the history of his people.

Cast 

Zubin Mehta as himself
Derek Jacobi as narrator
Nigel Terry as Prophet Zarathustra
Paul Shelley as King Vishtaspa
Tom Alter as the Priest
Erick Avari as the Professor
Lewis Fiander as Tansar
Saeed Jaffrey as Jadhav Rana, the Hindu king
Nicholas Jones as King Gushnasp
Oengus MacNamara as Alexander
Amrish Puri as Nihavand ruler, the Amir
Soni Razdan as Thais
Khojeste Mistree as the Dasturji
Leybourne Callaghan as John Wilson
[[Crew of HMS Ambuscade]] as Extras

Reception 
The film has generated controversy within the Parsi community in India. Zoroastrians today hold different opinions concerning the person of Zarathustra: some view him as an enlightened philosopher and scholar, but a mortal being; others embrace a more mystical concept that he is an incarnation of the immortal Amesha Spenta possessing supernatural abilities.

In the film, Zarathustra is portrayed as a philosopher, rather than as a divine being endowed with divine wisdom; and one scene shows Zarathustra arguing in the court of King Vistasp that death is evil, which indicates the concept of reincarnation, a principle rejected by Zarathustra which expresses belief in resurrection instead. These conflicting perceptions have generated heat in the reactions to the film: "[…] the 90-minute presentation replete with misrepresentations and gross distortions, it was a dastardly attempt to convey an unhallowed portrayal of the religion and its prophet, the rarely militant conservatives fumed."

Three high priests—Hormazdyar Mirza, Kaikhushroo Jamapasa and Feroz Kotwal—stated in the journal Parsiana: "The film, if produced in the form and manner reported in the press, will be construed as a deliberate and malicious act intended to outrage religious beliefs by insulting the religion and beliefs of the Parsi community."

See also 
 The Path of Zarathustra

References

External links 
 

1986 films
English-language Indian films
Films about Zoroastrianism
1980s English-language films